The 2nd NACAC Under-25 Championships in Athletics were held in San Antonio, Texas, United States on August 9–11, 2002.   As in 2000 the event was open for athletes younger than 25 years.  A detailed report on the results was given.  However, the results were affected by doping (see below).

Medal summary
Medal winners are published.
Complete results can be found on the AtletismoCR, on the USA Track & Field, and the Trackie websites.

Men

Women

Doping

United States sprinter Crystal Cox, who initially was listed as winner of the women's 200m in 23.02s, was tested positive for ephedrine in the competition, a prohibited substance under the International Amateur Athletic Federation (IAAF) rules.  Therefore, she was issued a public warning by the United States Anti-Doping Agency and was disqualified from her first-place finish in the 200 meters.  The incident is also reported on the USA Track & Field website and considered in their published results list.<ref
name=usatf/>

In connection with investigations in the BALCO doping conspiracy, Crystal Cox has accepted a four-year
suspension and disqualification of her athletic results, beginning on November 3, 2001, for using
anabolic agents and hormones over a period from 2001 through 2004 in violation of the
International Association of Athletics Federations Anti-Doping Rules.
However, in a separate statement, she felt to be forced to sign the sanctions although being innocent.

In consequence, her silver medal in the 400 metres (51.63s) and the gold medal in the 4 × 400 metres relay (in 3:30.60 together with Marie Woodward, Chantee Earl, and Sasha Spencer) should have been forfeited.

Medal table (unofficial)

Participation
The participation of 245 athletes from 24 countries was reported.

 (13)
 (7)
 (2)
 (2)
 (38)
 (4)
 (4)
 (14)
 (4)
 (1)
 (3)
 Haïti (2)
 (5)
 (16)
 México (31)
 (1)
 (4)
 (8)
 (1)
 (4)
 (3)
 (3)
 (71)
 (4)

References

NACAC Under-23 Championships in Athletics
NACAC Under-25 Championships in Athletics
NACAC Under-25 Championships in Athletics
International track and field competitions hosted by the United States
NACAC Under-25 Championships in Athletics
Track and field in Texas
International sports competitions in Texas